Craig W. Hanmer (January 6, 1956 – January 2, 2011) was an American professional ice hockey player who played in the World Hockey Association (WHA). He played 27 games with the Indianapolis Racers during the 1974–75 WHA season after being drafted by the Racers in the second round, 17th overall, of the 1974 WHA Amateur Draft. He was also drafted in the third round, 53rd overall, of the 1976 NHL Amateur Draft by the Philadelphia Flyers.

Career statistics

References

External links

1956 births
2011 deaths
American men's ice hockey defensemen
Ice hockey people from Saint Paul, Minnesota
Indianapolis Racers draft picks
Indianapolis Racers players
Mohawk Valley Comets players
Philadelphia Flyers draft picks
St. Paul Vulcans players
Springfield Indians players